The 1995 PBA season was the 21st season of the Philippine Basketball Association (PBA).

Season highlights
Ramon Fernandez, one of the remaining pioneer players in the league announced his retirement on February 17. His #19 jersey was retired by the San Miguel Beermen in a ceremony held at the San Miguel Corporation offices in Mandaluyong.
The league returned to the Araneta Coliseum after a decade of absence with the scheduled games on Friday being held at the Big Dome.
The PBA All-star game returned to its old format of Veterans vs Rookies/Sophomores/Juniors team, also the All-Star event was moved in the month of July with the first-ever PBA fans day held at the Araneta Coliseum a week before the annual all-star game.
A mid-1990s rivalry was born between the Sunkist Orange Juicers and the Alaska Milkmen, the two teams battled in two memorable finals for the season. The Orange Juicers had won the first two conferences but failed in its bid to win the Grandslam with the Alaska Milkmen taking home the Third Conference trophy.
Vergel Meneses of Sunkist was the season's best, winning the prestigious MVP Award as well as the All-Star MVP and Best Player of the Conference in the Juicers' two straight championships.

Rule changes
The PBA board approved the rule changes for implementation starting this season:
The shot clock was reduced to 24 seconds from the previous 25 second limit. The 25 second shot clock was implemented since the league started in 1975 due to a limitation of the shot clock used at the Araneta Coliseum where it can only be set in 5 second intervals.
The first two minutes of each quarter will be played in "running time". The clock will only be stopped on fouls and violations.
Teams will now have six 90-second regular timeouts and one 20-second timeout for the eliminations and semifinals.
Substitutions during free throw situations are only allowed before the last free throw attempt.
Foul shooters are allowed to shoot their first free throw even if the other players are not yet in position in the lines bordering the painted area.

Opening ceremonies
The muses for the participating teams are as follows:

Champions
 All-Filipino Cup: Sunkist Orange Juicers
 Commissioner's Cup: Sunkist Orange Juicers
 Governor's Cup: Alaska Milkmen
 Team with best win–loss percentage: Sunkist Orange Juicers (49–23, .681)
 Best Team of the Year: Sunkist Orange Juicers (1st & Final)

All-Filipino Cup

Elimination round

Semifinal round

Third place playoffs 

|}

Finals

|}
Best Player of the Conference: Vergel Meneses (Sunkist)

Commissioner's Cup

Elimination round

Quarterfinal round

Playoffs

Third place playoffs 

|}

Finals

|}
Best Player of the Conference: Vergel Meneses (Sunkist)
Best Import of the Conference: Ronnie Grandison (Sunkist)

Governors' Cup

Elimination round

Semifinal round

Third place playoff 

|}

Finals

|}
Best Player of the Conference: Allan Caidic (San Miguel)
Best Import of the Conference: Stevin Smith (Sunkist)

Awards
 Most Valuable Player: Vergel Meneses (Sunkist)
 Rookie of the Year:  Jeffrey Cariaso (Alaska)
 Sportsmanship Award: Rey Evangelista (Purefoods)
 Most Improved Player: Bonel Balingit (Sunkist)
 Defensive Player of the Year: Art dela Cruz (San Miguel)
 Mythical Five:
Johnny Abarrientos (Alaska)
Bong Hawkins (Alaska)
Allan Caidic (San Miguel)
Benjie Paras (Shell)
Vergel Meneses (Sunkist)
 Mythical Second Team:
Boybits Victoria (Sunkist)
Jojo Lastimosa (Alaska)
Bonel Balingit (Sunkist)
Alvin Patrimonio (Purefoods)
Nelson Asaytono (Sunkist)
 All Defensive Team:
Jerry Codiñera (Purefoods)
Glenn Capacio (Purefoods)
Chris Jackson (Sta. Lucia)
Elpidio Villamin (Sunkist)
Art dela Cruz (San Miguel)

Awards given by the PBA Press Corps
 Coach of the Year: Derrick Pumaren (Sunkist)
 Mr. Quality Minutes: Porfirio "Jun" Marzan (Shell)
 Executive of the Year: Elmer Yanga (Swift)
 Comeback Player of the Year: Elpidio Villamin (Sunkist)
 Referee of the Year: Ernesto de Leon

Board of Governors
 Emilio Bernardino (Commissioner)
 Ruben Cleofe (Secretary)
 Jose Concepcion III (Chairman, Republic Flour Mills Corp.)
 Teodoro Dimayuga (Vice-Chairman, Purefoods Corp.)
 Nazario Avendaño (Treasurer, San Miguel Corp.)
 Wilfred Steven Uytengsu (General Milling Corp.)
 Eliseo Santiago (Pilipinas Shell Petroleum Corp.)
 Vicente Santos (Sta. Lucia Realty and Development, Inc)
 Luis Lorenzo, Sr (Pepsi Cola Products Philippines, Inc)
 Bernabe Navarro (La Tondeña Distillers, Inc)

Cumulative standings

References

 
PBA